Hymenachne is a genus of widespread wetlands plants that is in the grass family. They are commonly known as marsh grasses. They are distributed in tropical and subtropical regions of Asia, the Americas, and the Pacific Islands. A species from the Americas, H. amplexicaulis, is well known in other parts of the world as an introduced and invasive species.

Hymenachne is similar to genus Sacciolepis. Both were formerly considered part of Panicum.

Hymenachne aquatic plants frequently found in marshes and other wet habitats. Their stems are spongy with aerenchyma tissue. The longest stems can reach 4 meters. They are perennial, sometimes with rhizomes. The leaves are linear or lance-shaped. The inflorescence is usually a cylindrical, spike-shaped panicle, rarely with branches.

Diversity
 Accepted species
 Hymenachne amplexicaulis – West Indian marsh grass, olive hymenachne - West Indies; Latin America from Mexico to Uruguay; naturalized in Australia, parts of Asia, Florida
 Hymenachne assamica - China, Assam, Myanmar, Thailand
 Hymenachne donacifolia  - Cuba, Puerto Rico, Trinidad; Latin America from Honduras to Paraguay
 Hymenachne grumosa - Paraguay, Uruguay, Brazil, Argentina
 Hymenachne patens - China (Anhui, Fujian, Jiangxi)
 Hymenachne pernambucense - Paraguay, Uruguay, Brazil, Argentina
 Hymenachne wombaliensis - Zaïre

 formerly included
see Panicum Pennisetum Sacciolepis

References

Panicoideae
Poaceae genera